Saint or Surp Astvatsatsin Church may refer to:

 St. Astvatsatsin Church (Voskepar), Armenia
 Church of Saint Astvatsatsin, Darashamb, Iran
 Chugureti St. Astvatsatsin, an Armenian church in Old Tbilisi, Georgia
 Krtsanis Tsiranavor Surp Astvatsatsin, an Armenian church in Old Tbilisi, Georgia
 Surb Astvatsatsin Church of Areni, Areni, Armenia
 Surp Astvatsatsin Church of Karbi, a church in Aragatsotn, Armenia
 Vahramashen Surp Astvatsatsin, a church on Mount Aragats, Aragatsotn, Armenia
 Zoravor Surp Astvatsatsin Church, a church in Yerevan, Armenia
 Kamsarakan S. Astvatsatsin Church, a church next to the Cathedral of Talin, Aragatsotn, Armenia
 Surb Astvatsatsin Church, a church in the Noravank monastery complex in Vayots Dzor, Armenia
 Surp Astvatsatsin, a church in the abandoned village of Shenik, Aragatsotn, Armenia
 Surb Astvatsatsin or Karmravor Church, a church in Ashtarak, Aragatsotn, Armenia

See also
 Church of the Holy Mother of God (disambiguation)
 St. Astvatsatsin Monastery (disambiguation)